Michael L. Kurtz (born August 26, 1941) is an American professor emeritus of history at Southeastern Louisiana University in Hammond. Kurtz is known for his research into the assassination of John F. Kennedy.

Kurtz has written two books on the assassination of Kennedy. Crime of the Century was published in 1982 by University of Tennessee Press and The JFK Assassination Debate: Lone Gunman versus Conspiracy was published in 1996 by University Press of Kansas. Ten years after its release, Crime of the Century was described as the only book on the assassination written by an academic historian. Shortly before the release of his first book, Kurtz stated that he did not think there was enough evidence to show whether or not Lee Harvey Oswald was involved in the assassination, but that there was no question that there was a conspiracy". Kurtz said Kennedy was killed by crossfire from three gunmen, that the Warren Commission's investigation of the assassination was incompetent, and that the Executive branch of the United States government and United States House of Representatives were responsible for suppressing evidence. A review for Kurtz's second book on the assassination said he also accused the Warren Commission, the Central Intelligence Agency, and the Kennedy family of covering up evidence.

In 1995, Kurtz testified on the Kennedy assassination before the Assassination Records Review Board chaired by U.S. District Judge John R. Tunheim. As of 2013, Kurtz was reported to have taught a class on the assassination for over 40 years.

Kurtz has published on other topics of American history, notably the career of Louisiana Governor Earl Kemp Long, co-authored with the late professor Morgan D. Peoples of Louisiana Tech University.

Kurtz received a Bachelor of Arts from the University of New Orleans, a Master of Arts from the University of Tennessee at Knoxville, and a Ph.D. from Tulane University in New Orleans. He is married to the former Isabella Stoddard. The couple has a son,  Michael David Kurtz, an attorney, and a daughter, Linda Suzanne Kurtz, a degree-holding registered nurse.

Notes

1941 births
Living people
21st-century American historians
21st-century American male writers
American male non-fiction writers
Historians from Louisiana
Louisiana Republicans
People from Hammond, Louisiana
Researchers of the assassination of John F. Kennedy
Southeastern Louisiana University faculty
Tulane University alumni
University of New Orleans alumni
University of Tennessee alumni
Writers from New Orleans